Dillard Pruitt (born September 24, 1961) is an American amateur golfer, who formerly played professionally on the PGA Tour.

Pruitt was born and raised in Greenville, South Carolina. He attended Clemson University from 1981–1984 and was a distinguished member of the golf team. His leadership was a key part of the Tigers rise to prominence in golf in the 1980s. Pruitt was a two-time All-American (first team his senior year), three-time All-ACC and a key member of Clemson's 1982 ACC Championship team.  He turned professional in 1985. He played on the European Tour in 1986 and 1987 and joined the PGA Tour in 1988.

Pruitt played on the PGA Tour from 1988 to 1996. His highest finish on the money list was 63rd in 1991, when he won $271,861 and the Chattanooga Classic, his only PGA Tour victory. Pruitt was the first Clemson alum to win a PGA Tour event.  His best finish in a major championship was tied for 13th at the 1992 Masters. Since retiring as a touring professional, Pruitt has work for the PGA Tour as a rules official.

Pruitt's amateur status was reinstated by the United States Golf Association (USGA) in 2001. He went on to win the 2002 Sunnehanna Amateur and the 2002 Canadian Amateur Championship. He was named to the 2003 Walker Cup Team. This led to a firestorm of controversy within the golfing world. The USGA was heavily criticized for allowing a former PGA tournament champion to regain his amateur status. 

Pruitt is the brother-in-law of golfer Jay Haas, who is married to his sister Jan.

Amateur wins
1982 South Carolina State Amateur
1983 Sunnehanna Amateur
2002 Sunnehanna Amateur, Canadian Amateur Championship

Professional wins (2)

PGA Tour wins (1)

Other wins (1)
1996 Jerry Ford Invitational

Results in major championships

Note: Pruitt never played in The Open Championship.

CUT = Missed the half-way cut
"T" = Tied

See also
1987 PGA Tour Qualifying School graduates
1989 PGA Tour Qualifying School graduates
1990 PGA Tour Qualifying School graduates

References

External links

American male golfers
Clemson Tigers men's golfers
European Tour golfers
PGA Tour golfers
Golf administrators
Golfers from South Carolina
Sportspeople from Greenville, South Carolina
1961 births
Living people